Jianzhi Sengcan (Pīnyīn: Jiànzhì Sēngcàn;;) is known as the Third Chinese Patriarch of Chán after Bodhidharma and thirtieth Patriarch after Siddhārtha Gautama Buddha.

He is considered to be the Dharma successor of the second Chinese Patriarch, Dazu Huike (Pīnyīn: Dàzǔ Huìkě;;). Sengcan is best known as the putative author of the famous Chan poem, Xinxin Ming  (Pīnyīn: Xìnxīn Míng;), the title of which means "".

Biography
The year and place of Sengcan's birth is unknown, as is his family name.

Huike
It is said that Sengcan (old spelling: Tsang Tsan) was over forty years old when he first met Huike in 536  and that he stayed with his teacher for six years. (Dumoulin, p 97) It was Huike who gave him the name Sengcan (“Gem Monk”).

The Transmission of the Lamp entry on Sengcan begins with a koan-like encounter with Huike:
Sengcan: I am riddled with sickness. Please absolve me of my sin.
Huike: Bring your sin here and I will absolve you.
Sengcan (after a long pause): When I look for my sin, I cannot find it.
Huike: I have absolved you. You should live by the Buddha, the Dharma, and the Sangha.

There are discrepancies about how long Sengcan stayed with Huike. The Transmission of the Lamp records that he “attended Huike for two years”  after which Huike passed on the robe of Bodhidharma and Bodhidharma's Dharma (generally considered to be the Lankavatara Sutra), making him the Third Patriarch of Chan.

According to Dumoulin, in 574 the accounts say that he fled with Huike to the mountains due to the Buddhist persecution underway at that time. However, the Lamp records claim that after giving Sengcan Dharma transmission, Huike warned Sengcan to live in the mountains and “Wait for the time when you can transmit the Dharma to someone else.” as a prediction made to Bodhidharma (Huike's teacher) by Prajnadhara, the twenty-seventh Chan ancestor in India, foretold of a coming calamity.

After receiving transmission, Sengcan lived in hiding on Wangong Mountain in Yixian and then on Sikong Mountain in southwestern Anhui. Thereafter, for ten years he wandered with no fixed abode.

Daoxin
He met Daoxin, (580-651)  a novice monk of just fourteen, in 592. Daoxin attended Sengcan for nine years and received Dharma transmission when he was still in his early twenties.

Subsequently, Sengcan spent two years at Mount Luofu (Lo-fu shan, northeast of Kung-tung (Canton)) before returning to Wangong Mountain. He died sitting under a tree before a Dharma assembly in 606.

Dumoulin  notes that a Chinese official, Li Ch’ang found Sengcan's grave in Shu-chou in 745 or 746.

Sengcan received the honorary title   (“Mirror Wisdom”)  from the Tang dynasty emperor Xuan Zong.

Teachings
Sengcan, like Bodhidharma and Huike before him, was reputed to be a devotee and specialist in the study of the Lankavatara Sutra, which taught the elimination of all duality and the “forgetting of words and thoughts”, stressing the contemplation of wisdom.

However, McRae describes the link between Bodhidharma (and therefore Sengcan) and the Lankavatara Sutra as “superficial”. The link between this sutra and the “Bodhidharma school” is provided in Tao-hsuan's Further Biographies of Eminent Monks where, in the biography of Fa-ch’ung  he “stresses that Hui-k’o was the first to grasp the essence of the Lankavatara Sutra”  and includes Sengcan as one who “discoursed on but did not write about the profound message of the Lankavatara Sutra. Due to the lack of authentic evidence, comments on Sengcan's teachings are speculative.

Writings
Although Sengcan has traditionally been honored as the author of the Xinxin Ming (W-G:Hsin-hsin Ming, "Faith in Mind"), most modern scholars dismiss this as improbable.

Limited sources 
The historical record of Sengcan is extremely limited. Of all the Chan patriarchs, Sengcan is the most ambiguous and the least known:

Further Biographies of Eminent Monks
The earliest recorded note naming Sengcan is in Further Biographies of Eminent Monks (645) (Japanese, Zoku kosoden; Pinyin, Xu gaoseng zhuan) by Daoxuan (?- 667) where Sengcan is named, immediately after Huike’s name, as one of seven disciples of Huike in a biographical entry of the Lankavatara sutra master, Fa-ch’ung (587-665) No further information is given.

It was not until the Records of the Transmission of the Dharma-treasure (Sh’uan fa-pao chi), compiled about 710 and drawing on the stories in the Further Biographies of Eminent Monks, that a teaching “lineage” for Chan was created. Some have speculated that it was merely the fact that Sengcan's name immediately followed Huike's name in the latter work that led to him being named as the Third Patriarch of Chan.

Transmission of the Lamp
Therefore, the biography that follows is garnered largely from traditional biographies of Sengcan, mainly the Transmission of the Lamp.

Most of what is known about his life comes from the Wudeng Huiyuan (Compendium of Five Lamps), compiled in the early 13th century by the monk Puji at Lingyin Temple in Hangzhou. The first of the five records in the compendium is a text commonly referred to as the Transmission of the Lamp  and it is from this text that most of the information about Sengcan is garnered.

However, it should be kept in mind that most modern scholars have some doubts about the historical accuracy of the Lamp records.

Notes

References

Sources

 Thomas Cleary (1990) Transmission of Light: Zen in the Art of Enlightenment by Zen Master Keizan, North Point Press 
 Dumoulin, Heinrich (1994, 1998) Zen Buddhism: A History, Volume I, India and China, Simon & Schuster and Prentice Hall International 
 Ferguson, Andy (2000) Zen's Chinese heritage: the masters and their teachings, 
 Chen, Jinhua (1999) "One Name, Three Monks: Two Northern Chan Masters Emerge from the Shadow of Their Contemporary, the Tiantai Master Zhanran 湛然 (711–782)." The Journal of the International Association of Buddhist Studies 22 (1): 1-91.
 McRae, John R (1986) The Northern School and the Formation of Early Ch'an Buddhism, University of Hawaii Press, 
 McRae, John R (2003) Seeing Through Zen: Encounter, Transformation, and Genealogy in Chinese Chan Buddhism, University of California Press

Further reading
Yampolsky, Philip (1999) Ch'an-A Historical Sketch in Buddhist Spirituality: Later China, Korea, Japan and the Modern World, Takeuchi Yoshinor ed., SCM Press, 
Yampolsky, Philip (1967) The Platform Sutra of the Sixth Patriarch: the text of the Tun-Huang manuscript, translated with notes by, Columbia University Press,  (introduction available online)
Foster, Nelson; Shoemaker, Jack (eds)(1996) The Roaring Stream: A New Zen Reader, The Ecco Press,

External links
 The Hsin Hsin Ming (Verses on the Faith Mind) translated by Robert B. Clarke
 The Hsin Hsin Ming (Verses on the Faith Mind) translated by Daisetz Teitaro Suzuki
 The Hsin Hsin Ming (Verses on the Faith Mind) translated by Master Sheng-Yen
 The Hsin Hsin Ming (Verses on the Faith Mind) translated by Dusan Pajin
 Biographical Information about Sengcan as well as the Hsin Hsin Ming itself
 Dharma talks, teishos, translations and historical information on Hsin Hsin Ming
 

Chan Buddhists
3
Chen dynasty Buddhists
Sui dynasty Buddhists
Chinese Zen Buddhists
606 deaths
Year of birth unknown